Joy Hollingsworth (born March 15, 1984), recently announced candidate for Seattle City Council district 3, is a former American basketball player and coach. She played basketball at the college level for the  University of San Francisco and then later at the University of Arizona. She was an assistant coach at Seattle University. Hollingsworth is now part of her family's marijuana business, The Hollingsworth Cannabis Company (THC Co.), which is based in Washington.

Biography 
Hollingsworth's paternal grandmother, Dorothy Hollingsworth, was a prominent educator and civil rights activist in Seattle. Her uncle is former Sonics player, Bruce Seals. Hollingsworth's mother, Rhonda, moved from New Orleans to Seattle to be closer to her brother, Bruce. Joy Hollingsworth was born in Seattle on March 15, 1984.

Hollingsworth played for Seattle Prep and led the basketball team to their first girls state title in 2002. She started playing college basketball at the University of San Francisco and then later transferred to the University of Arizona after two years. She earned her Bachelor of Arts in 2007 from the University of Arizona and in 2009, earned a Masters in Education in Intercollegiate Athletics Leadership from the University of Washington. Before the 2009–2010 basketball season, she was hired as the assistant women's basketball coach at Seattle University. Hollingsworth also played basketball in Athens, and has written for ESPN The Magazine.

Hollingsworth left coaching in 2012. In 2013, Hollingsworth and her family went into the marijuana business, growing plants for their own business, the Hollingsworth Cannabis Company (THC Co.), located in Shelton. Hollingsworth's job in the family business is to oversee processing. Their marijuana farm has around 9,000 plants.

In 2023, Hollingsworth announced that she would be running for Seattle City Council, vying for the District 3 seat held by Kshama Sawant.

San Francisco and Arizona statistics

Source

References

External links 
Joy Hollingsworth on KCRW
 Joy for Seattle, District 3 City Council campaign site

1984 births
Living people
African-American basketball players
American women's basketball players
Basketball players from Seattle
Businesspeople in the cannabis industry
Seattle University faculty
Businesspeople from Seattle
University of Arizona alumni
University of San Francisco alumni
American women academics
21st-century African-American sportspeople
21st-century African-American women
20th-century African-American people
20th-century African-American women